Abraxas suffusa is a species of moth belonging to the family Geometridae. It was described by Warren in 1894. It is known from Tibet.

References

Abraxini
Moths of Asia
Moths described in 1894